Hidden Mountain is the eighth studio album by Bugskull, released on January 18, 2012 by Almost Halloween Time.

Track listing

Personnel 
Adapted from the Hidden Mountain liner notes.
 Sean Byrne – lead vocals, acoustic guitar
 Aaron Day – electric guitar, synthesizer, trumpet

Release history

References

External links 
 
 Hidden Mountain at Bandcamp

2012 albums
Bugskull albums